The  is a historic wedding, hotel and restaurant building located on the eastern edge of Shimomeguro.

It is known for the historic 100 Steps Staircase (Hyakudan Kaidan) and a series of historicist rooms that are used for exhibitions.

References

External links 
Museum Hotel of Japan 

Hotels in Tokyo